Ralph Urbigkit (died March 8, 2015) was an American politician. He served as a Democratic member of the Wyoming House of Representatives.

Life and career 
Urbigkit was a rancher.

In 1967, Urbigkit was elected to the Wyoming House of Representatives, representing Fremont County, Wyoming.

He was married to Eileen Urbigkeit for 66 years and they had 4 children.
Urbigkit died March 8, 2015 and his wife died the following year.

References 

Year of birth missing
2015 deaths
Democratic Party members of the Wyoming House of Representatives
Ranchers from Wyoming
20th-century American politicians